Thelephora ganbajun, or "ganba fungus," 干巴菌 / 乾巴菌, is a species of coral fungus in the family Thelephoraceae. It was described as new to science in 1987 by Chinese mycologist Mu Zang. It is found in Yunnan, where it grows on Pinus yunnanensis and Pinus kesiya var. langbianensis.

References

External links

Fungi described in 1987
Fungi of China
Edible fungi
ganbajun